Beautiful Mistake (Welsh: Camgymeriad Gwych) is a 2000 British music documentary film directed by Marc Evans starring James Dean Bradfield, Huw Bunford and Cian Ciaran.

Synopsis
This documentary film follows a group of Welsh musicians interacting and playing in the studio. Premiered at the Cardiff International Film Festival in November 2000.

Cast
 James Dean Bradfield as himself
 Huw Bunford as himself
 John Cale as himself
 Euros Childs as himself
 Megan Childs as herself
 Cian Ciaran as himself
 Dafydd Ieuan as himself
 Richard James as himself
 Patrick Jones as himself
 Cerys Matthews as herself
 Guto Pryce as himself
 Gruff Rhys as himself

References

External links
 

2000 films
2000 documentary films
British documentary films
Documentary films about rock music and musicians
Welsh music
Films directed by Marc Evans
Films scored by John Cale
2000s English-language films
2000s British films